The Archdiocese of Saint-Pierre and Fort-de-France (French: Archidiocèse de Saint-Pierre et Fort-de-France), more simply known as the Archdiocese of Fort-de-France, is a Latin Church ecclesiastical territory or archdiocese of the Catholic Church in the Caribbean. The archdiocese comprises the entirety of the French overseas department of Martinique.
 
A metropolitan archdiocese, its ecclesiastical province includes the suffragan dioceses of Cayenne and Basse-Terre, and all are members of the Antilles Episcopal Conference.

Archbishop Gilbert Marie Michel Méranville's retirement for age reasons was accepted by Pope Francis on Saturday, 7 March 2015; he is succeeded by Msg. David Macaire, O.P., a Dominican priest who until then had been serving as prior of the convent La Sainte-Baume, in Toulon, France and as of now, the incumbent prelate.

, the diocese contained 47 parishes, 35 active diocesan priests, 23 religious priests and 310,000 Catholics. It also has 171 Women Religious and 33 Religious Brothers.

History 
The diocese received its present status on 27 September 1850, when the Apostolic Prefecture of Îles de la Terre Ferme (which had lost French Guiana in 1731) was promoted from the missionary status of Apostolic Prefecture to Diocese of Martinique (Latin: Dioecesis Martinicensis; French: Diocèse de la Martinique), but also lost territory to establish the Diocese of Guadeloupe et Basse-Terre.

1853.09.12, it was renamed as Diocese of Saint-Pierre, 1902.05.08 again as Diocese of Fort-de-France–Saint-Pierre.

It was elevated to an archdiocese on 26 September 1967.

Bishops

Episcopal incumbents 

Bishops of Saint-Pierre
Etienne Jean François Le Herpeur (1850–1858; till 1853 as Bishop of Martinique)
Louis-Martin Porchez (1858–1860)
Amand-Joseph Fava (1871–1875)
Julien-François-Pierre Carmené (1875–1897)
Étienne-Joseph-Frédéric Tanoux (1898–1899)
Maurice-Charles-Alfred de Cormont (1899–1902 see below)
Bishops of Fort-de-France–Saint-Pierre
Maurice-Charles-Alfred de Cormont (see above 1902–1911)
Joseph Félix François Malleret C.S.Sp. (1912–1914)
Paul-Louis-Joseph Lequien (1915–1941)
Henri-Marie-François Varin de la Brunelière C.S.Sp. (1941–1967 see below)
Metropolitan Archbishops of Fort-de-France–Saint-Pierre
Henri-Marie-François Varin de la Brunelière C.S.Sp. (see above 1967–1972)
Maurice Rigobert Marie-Sainte (1972–2004)
Gilbert Marie Michel Méranville (2004–2015)
David Macaire, O.P. (7 March 2015–present)

Auxiliary bishop
Maurice Rigobert Marie-Sainte (1968-1972), appointed Archbishop here

Churches
 
Our Lady of the Assumption Church at Sainte-Marie, Martinique

Notes

References
 GigaCatholic, with episcopal incumbent biographies

External links
 

Religion in Martinique
Roman Catholic dioceses in the Caribbean
Diocese
Religious organizations established in 1850
1850 establishments in France
A